In mathematics, quadratic Jordan algebras are a generalization of Jordan algebras introduced by . The fundamental identities of the quadratic representation of a linear Jordan algebra are used as axioms to define a quadratic Jordan algebra over a field of arbitrary characteristic. There is a uniform description of finite-dimensional simple quadratic Jordan algebras, independent of characteristic. If 2 is invertible in the field of coefficients, the theory of quadratic Jordan algebras reduces to that of linear Jordan algebras.

Definition
A quadratic Jordan algebra consists of a vector space A over a field K with a distinguished element 1 and a quadratic map of A into the K-endomorphisms of A, a ↦ Q(a), satisfying the conditions:

 ;
  ("fundamental identity");
  ("commutation identity"), where 

Further, these properties are required to hold under any extension of scalars.

Elements
A Jordan division algebra is one in which every non-zero element is invertible.

Structure
Let B be a subspace of A.  Define B to be a quadratic ideal or an inner ideal if the image of Q(b) is contained in B for all b in B; define B to be an outer ideal if B is mapped into itself by every Q(a) for all a in A.  An ideal of A is a subspace which is both an inner and an outer ideal.  A quadratic Jordan algebra is simple if it contains no non-trivial ideals.

For given b, the image of Q(b) is an inner ideal: we call this the principal inner ideal on b.

The centroid Γ of A is the subset of EndK(A) consisting of endomorphisms T which "commute" with Q in the sense that for all a
T Q(a) = Q(a) T;
Q(Ta) = Q(a) T2.

The centroid of a simple algebra is a field: A is central if its centroid is just K.

Examples

Quadratic Jordan algebra from an associative algebra
If A is a unital associative algebra over K with multiplication × then a quadratic map Q can be defined from A to EndK(A) by Q(a) : b  ↦ a × b × a.  This defines a quadratic Jordan algebra structure  on A.  A quadratic Jordan algebra is special if it is isomorphic to a subalgebra of such an algebra, otherwise exceptional.

Quadratic Jordan algebra from a quadratic form
Let A be a vector space over K with a quadratic form q and associated symmetric bilinear form q(x,y) = q(x+y) - q(x) - q(y).  Let e be a "basepoint" of A, that is, an element with q(e) = 1.  Define a linear functional T(y) = q(y,e) and a "reflection" y∗ = T(y)e - y.  For each x we define Q(x) by

Q(x) : y ↦ q(x,y∗)x − q(x) y∗ .

Then Q defines a quadratic Jordan algebra on A.

Quadratic Jordan algebra from a linear Jordan algebra
Let A be a unital Jordan algebra over a field K of characteristic not equal to 2. For a in A, let L denote the left multiplication map in the associative enveloping algebra

and define a K-endomorphism of A, called the quadratic representation, by

Then Q defines a quadratic Jordan algebra.

Quadratic Jordan algebra defined by a linear Jordan algebra
The quadratic identities can be proved in a finite-dimensional Jordan algebra over R or C following Max Koecher, who used an invertible element. They are also easy to prove in a Jordan algebra defined by a unital associative algebra (a "special" Jordan algebra) since in that case Q(a)b = aba. They are valid in any Jordan algebra over a field of characteristic not equal to 2. This was conjectured by Jacobson and proved in : Macdonald showed that if a polynomial identity in three variables, linear in the third, is valid in any special Jordan algebra, then it holds in all Jordan algebras. In  an elementary proof, due to McCrimmon and Meyberg, is given for Jordan algebras over a field of characteristic not equal to 2.

Koecher's proof
Koecher's arguments apply for finite-dimensional Jordan algebras over the real or complex numbers.

Fundamental identity I
An element a in A is called invertible if it is invertible in R[a] or C[a]. If b denotes the inverse, then power associativity of a shows that L(a) and L(b) commute.

In fact a is invertible if and only if Q(a) is invertible. In that case

Indeed if Q(a) is invertible it carries R[a] onto itself. On the other hand Q(a)1 = a2, so

The Jordan identity

can be polarized by replacing a by a + tc and taking the coefficient of t. Rewriting this as an operator applied to c yields

Taking b = a−1 in this polarized Jordan identity yields

Replacing a by its inverse, the relation follows if L(a) and L(a−1) are invertible. If not it holds for a + ε1 with ε arbitrarily small and hence also in the limit.

For c in A and F(a) a function on A with values in End A, let
DcF(a) be the derivative at t = 0 of F(a + tc). Then

where Q(a,b) if the polarization of Q

Since L(a) commutes with L(a−1)

Hence

so that

Applying Dc to L(a−1)Q(a) = L(a) and acting on b = c−1 yields

On the other hand L(Q(a)b) is invertible on an open dense set where Q(a)b must also be invertible with

Taking the derivative Dc in the variable b in the expression above gives

This yields the fundamental identity for a dense set of invertible elements, so it follows in general by continuity. The fundamental identity implies that c = Q(a)b is invertible if a and b are invertible and gives a formula for the inverse of Q(c). Applying it to c gives the inverse identity in full generality.

Commutation identity I
As shown above, if a is invertible,

Taking Dc with a as the variable gives

Replacing a by a−1 gives, applying Q(a) and using the fundamental identity gives

Hence

Interchanging b and c gives

so that for a invertible and hence by continuity for all a

Mccrimmon–Meyberg proof

Commutation identity II
The Jordan identity  can be polarized by replacing a by a + tc and taking the coefficient of t. This gives

In operator notation this implies

Polarizing in a again gives

Written as operators acting on d, this gives

Replacing c by b and b by a gives

Also, since the right hand side is symmetric in b and c, interchanging b and c on the left and subtracting , it follows that the commutators [L(b),L(c)] are derivations of the Jordan algebra.

Let

Then Q(a) commutes with L(a) by the Jordan identity.

From the definitions if  is the associated symmetric bilinear mapping, then  and

Moreover

Indeed

By the second and first polarized Jordan identities this implies

So by the last identity with ab in place of b this implies the commutation identity:

The identity Q(a)R(b,a) = R(a,b)Q(a) can be strengthened to

Indeed applied to c, the first two terms give

Switching b and c then gives

Fundamental identity II
The identity  is proved using the Lie bracket relations

Indeed the polarization in c of the identity  gives

Applying both sides to d, this shows that

In particular these equations hold for x = ab. On the other hand if T = [L(a),L(b)] then D(z) = Tz is a derivation of the Jordan algebra, so that

The Lie bracket relations follow because R(a,b) = T + L(ab).

Since the Lie bracket on the left hand side is antisymmetric,

As a consequence

Indeed set a = y, b = x, c = z, d = x and make both sides act on y.

On the other hand

Indeed this follows by setting x = Q(a)b in

Hence, combining these equations with the strengthened commutation identity,

Linear Jordan algebra defined by a quadratic Jordan algebra
Let A be a quadratic Jordan algebra over R or C. Following , a linear Jordan algebra structure can be associated with A such that, if L(a) is Jordan multiplication, then the quadratic structure is given by Q(a) = 2L(a)2 − L(a2).

Firstly the axiom Q(a)R(b,a) = R(a,b)Q(a) can be strengthened to

Indeed applied to c, the first two terms give

Switching b and c then gives

Now let

Replacing b by a and a by 1 in the identity above gives

In particular

If furthermore a is invertible then

Similarly if '''b is invertible

The Jordan product is given by

so that

The formula above shows that 1 is an identity. Defining a2 by a∘a = Q(a)1, the only remaining condition to be verified is the Jordan identity

In the fundamental identity

Replace a by a + t, set b = 1 and compare the coefficients of t2 on both sides:

Setting b = 1 in the second axiom gives

and therefore L(a) must commute with L(a2).

Shift identity
In a unital linear Jordan algebra the shift identity asserts that

Following , it can be established as a direct consequence of polarized forms of the fundamental identity and the commutation or homotopy identity. It is also a consequence of Macdonald's theorem since it is an operator identity involving only two variables.

For a in a unital linear Jordan algebra A the quadratic representation is given by

so the corresponding symmetric bilinear mapping is

The other operators are given by the formula

so that

The commutation or homotopy identity

can be polarized in a. Replacing a by a + t1 and taking the coefficient of t gives

The fundamental identity

can be polarized in a. Replacing a by a +t1 and taking the coefficients of t gives (interchanging a and b)

Combining the two previous displayed identities yields

Replacing a by a +t1 in the fundamental identity and taking the coefficient of t2 gives

Since the right hand side is symmetric this implies

These identities can be used to prove the shift identity:

It is equivalent to the identity

By the previous displayed identity this is equivalent to

On the other hand the bracketed terms can be simplified by the third displayed identity.

For finite-dimensional unital Jordan algebras, the shift identity can be seen more directly using mutations. Let a and b be invertible, and let
 be the Jordan multiplication in Ab. Then
.  Moreover
.
on the other hand  and similarly with a and b interchanged. Hence

Thus

so the shift identity follows by cancelling Q(b). A density argument allows the invertibility assumption to be dropped.

Jordan pairs

A linear unital Jordan algebra gives rise to a quadratic mapping Q and associated mapping R satisfying the fundamental identity, the commutation of homotopy identity and the shift identity. Omitting ± subscripts, these must satisfy

the fundamental identity

the commutation or homotopy identity

and the shift identity

A unital Jordan algebra A defines a Jordan pair by taking V± = A with its quadratic structure maps Q and R''.

See also
Mutation (Jordan algebra)

Notes

References

Further reading

Non-associative algebras